We Are All We Have is the eighth full-length studio album from American street punk band The Casualties, on the record label SideOneDummy Records. The band started a headlining tour in support of the album on August 20, 2009.

It is released on CD and LP.

Track listing
"Carry on the Flag" - 1:06
"We Are All We Have" - 3:05
"Heart Bleeds Black" - 2:20
"Rise and Fall" - 2:23
"Apocalypse Today" - 2:18
"War is Business" - 1:47
"In the Tombs" - 4:25
"Stand Against Them All" - 2:24
"Depression - Unemployment Lines" - 3:06
"Looking Thru Bloodshot Eyes" - 2:47
"Lonely on the Streets - Jersey City" - 3:01
"Life Clone" - 1:56
"Clockwork" - 1:48
"Rockers' Reggae (Working Man's Dub)" - 8:06

References

2009 albums
The Casualties albums
SideOneDummy Records albums
Albums produced by Bill Stevenson (musician)